Başköy Dam is a dam in Ağrı Province, Turkey, built between 1998 and 2003.

See also
List of dams and reservoirs in Turkey

External links
DSI

Dams in Ağrı Province
Dams completed in 2003